Prince Racing is a Hong Kong auto racing team based in Wong Chuk Hang, Hong Kong. The team currently races in the TCR International Series and TCR Asia Series. Having previously raced in the Porsche Carrera Cup Asia amongst others.

TCR International Series & TCR Asia Series

Honda Civic TCR (2015–)
The team will enter the 2015 TCR International Series season and 2015 TCR Asia Series season with Kenneth Lau and Michael Choi driving a Honda Civic TCR each.

References

Hong Kong auto racing teams
TCR International Series teams
TCR Asia Series teams